Eastern Michigan University (EMU, Eastern Michigan or simply Eastern), is a public research university in Ypsilanti, Michigan. Founded in 1849 as Michigan State Normal School, the school was the fourth normal school established in the United States and the first American normal school founded outside New England. In 1899, the Michigan State Normal School became the first normal school in the nation to offer a four-year curriculum. The normal school became a university in 1959, gaining the current name of Eastern Michigan University.

EMU is one of the eight research universities in the State of Michigan and is classified among "R2: Doctoral Universities – High research activity". It is governed by an eight-member board of regents whose members are appointed by the governor of Michigan and confirmed by the Michigan Senate for eight-year terms.

The university comprises eight colleges and schools: College of Arts and Sciences, College of Business, College of Education, College of Health and Human Services, College of Technology, the School of Music & Dance, an Honors College, and a Graduate School. The university's site is composed of an academic and athletic campus spread across , with over 120 buildings. EMU has a total enrollment of more than 15,000 students.

Since 1991 Eastern Michigan athletes have been known as "Eagles" and the school mascot, Swoop, was officially adopted by the university three years later. The university's student-athletes compete as the Eastern Michigan Eagles in the NCAA Division I Mid-American Conference.

History

Influenced by similar academies in Europe, the state of Michigan founded its first normal school, Michigan State Normal School, in 1849, and open its door in 1853, thirty years after the first normal school in the United States, the Columbian School, was founded in Concord, Vermont by Reverend Samuel Read Hall. The Michigan State Normal School was the fourth normal school established in the United States and the first American normal school founded outside New England. The American normal schools intended to improve the quality of the burgeoning common school system by producing more qualified teachers.

Adonijah Welch, a University of Michigan graduate, served as the normal school's first principal. He later became the first president of Iowa State Agricultural College, now Iowa State University. The Georgian Revival style Welch Hall is named after him. Welch Hall, constructed in 1895, is the second-oldest surviving building on the Ypsilanti campus and an Eastern Michigan University Historic District contributing property. Classes started on March 29, 1853, with 122 students enrolled.

In 1899, the school became the Michigan State Normal College when it developed the first four-year curriculum for a normal college in the nation. Normal began the 20th century as Michigan's premier teacher-preparatory school and had become the first teacher-training school in the United States to have a four-year degree program. The school continued through World War I, the Great Depression, and World War II, and expanded further. In 1956, under President Eugene Elliott, the school officially became Eastern Michigan College. This was mostly due to the expansion of the school's programs and increased enrollment following the Second World War.

In 1959 the school became a university, gaining the title Eastern Michigan University after establishing the Graduate School (graduate classes had been offered for two decades, since 1939). Between 1959 through 1980 the College of Education, College of Arts and Sciences, Graduate School, College of Business, College of Health and Human Services, and College of Technology were established. In the early 1970s, international student exchange schemes were organized, including one with Coventry College of Education (later part of the University of Warwick) in Britain. In 2005, the Honors Program became the Eastern Michigan University Honors College.

More recently, extended programs were added, such as Continuing Education (which includes EMU Online), the Centers for Corporate Training, the World College, and numerous community-focused institutes. Today the university's total student population averages about 23,000, of whom roughly 5,000 are graduate students. Most programs are undergraduate or master's level, although the university has doctoral programs in Educational Leadership, Technology, and Psychology.

Under Michigan's 1964 state constitution, Eastern Michigan University is governed by an eight-member Board of Regents. The Regents are appointed by the governor, "with the advice and consent of the Senate", and serve eight-year terms. The Regents, in turn, elect the president of the university.

Academics

Admissions

Undergraduate 

EMU is considered "selective" by U.S. News & World Report. For the Class of 2025 (enrolled fall 2021), EMU received 17,506 applications and accepted 14,811 (84.6%). Of those accepted, 2,312 enrolled, a yield rate (the percentage of accepted students who choose to attend the university) of 15.6%. EMU's freshman retention rate is 69%, with 48% going on to graduate within six years.

For fall 2021, EMU received 2,875 applications for transfer admission and accepted 2,129, an admission rate of 74.1%. Of those accepted, 1,139 enrolled, a yield rate of 53.5%. A transfer applicant must have a minimum of 12 credits completed and maintain a 2.0 overall grade point average (or better).

The enrolled first-year class of 2025 had the following standardized test scores: the middle 50% range (25th–75th percentiles) of SAT scores was 950–1180, while the middle 50% range of ACT scores was 18–25.

Academic divisions

Eastern Michigan University offers degrees and programs at the bachelor's, master's, specialist's and doctoral levels. There are more than 200 majors and minors at the undergraduate level, and more than 170 graduate programs. EMU has six Academic Divisions and eight University Sites which include satellite campuses. Just like many other large universities EMU does offer online courses and degrees.

The university has seven colleges and schools: College of Arts and Sciences, College of Business, College of Education, College of Health and Human Services, College of Technology, Honors College, and the Graduate School. The Honors College and Graduate school handles courses that are honors and graduate program within the various colleges. Eastern has offered graduate courses since 1939. The graduate school has close to 5,000 students enrolled in masters and doctoral programs and is house in Boone Hall.

The two oldest colleges at the university are the College of Arts and Sciences and the College of Education. The largest college is the College of Arts and Sciences (CAS) with 125 programs of study. Beyond this CAS oversees the most facilities such as Ford Gallery, Sherzer Hall, Kresge Environmental Education Center, the Terrestrial and Aquatic Ecology Research Facility, and Pease Auditorium. Eastern Michigan has had a long history of developing educators since its founding. EMU prides itself as the largest producer of educational personnel in the country since 1991. Eastern Michigan University's Department of Special Education is among the oldest special education program in the United States, started In 1923.

The College of Business (COB) was established in 1964. The COB is known for having the First Ethos Week and Ethos Honor Society in the country.

Eastern Michigan University established the College of Human Services in 1975. Eventually the university changed the name to the College of Health and Human Services on April 21, 1982.

The two most recent established colleges are the College of Technology (COT) in 2008 and the Honors College in 2005. The EMU Honors Program started in 1984.

Its most popular undergraduate majors, by 2021 graduates, were:
Registered Nursing/Registered Nurse (500)
Psychology (189)
Social Work (173)
Multi-/Interdisciplinary Studies (142)
Speech Communication and Rhetoric (105)
Business Administration and Management (94)
Marketing/Marketing Management (93)
Accounting (83)
Biology/Biological Sciences (81)
Computer Science (81)

Campus

Ypsilanti 

Eastern Michigan University's main campus is located in Ypsilanti, Michigan, comprising 122 buildings and spanning .

Satellite campuses 
EMU offers courses at 7 satellite campuses. The earliest off-site campus is EMU-Jackson. Courses have been offered in Jackson, Michigan since the 1970s. Course catalog records show courses have been offered at the Kresge Environmental Center dating back to at least 1976. EMU has held courses in Flint and Traverse City since 1987. EMU–Livonia began offering courses in 2000. In 2001, EMU–Detroit opened. EMU opened its Monroe location in 2002. The last off-campus site, EMU–Brighton, opened in 2003. EMU and Grand Valley State University offers a joint doctoral program in Educational Leadership at the Eberhard Center in Grand Rapids, Michigan. The Eberhard Center facility is part of the GVSU downtown campus. This location is sometimes referred to as EMU–Grand Rapids but is not officially listed as a university site.

EMU–Brighton – Brighton, MI
EMU–Detroit – Detroit, MI
EMU–Jackson – Jackson, MI
EMU–Livonia – Livonia, MI
EMU–Monroe – Monroe, MI
EMU–Northern Michigan – Traverse City, MI
Kresge Environmental Center – Lapeer, MI

Student life

Just like many large universities EMU has many student oriented facilities outside the classroom. The university has plays, musicals, student organizations, and various social activities for students. On-campus hangouts include the Student Center, The Rec/IM, Halle Library, and dining facilities like the Eastern Eateries and the Commons (DC1). EMU's office of Campus Life provides many co-curricular opportunities for both resident students and commuter students which include Friday night movies, Laugh Lounge and Sky Lounge. In addition to activities on campus, EMU's campus life office also organizes occasional "Eastern Excursions" to cities such as Detroit, Cleveland, and Chicago. Off-campus hangouts include Depot Town, Frog Island, Riverside Park, downtown Ann Arbor and The Ugly Mug coffee shop.

Student organizations
Student Organizations at Eastern are housed under Campus Life. Most academic departments on campus have at least one student organization for students who are interested in that subject area. Students work with volunteer organizations such as Habitat for Humanity both during the school year and on breaks. Other clubs include the Muslim Student Association, Eastern Michigan Smash Club (EMUSC) and the LGBTA (Lesbian, Gay, Bisexual, Transgender/Transsexual Association). Eastern Michigan University has over 340 student clubs and organizations.

EMU offers a variety of Greek organizations on campus. The Greek system provides fraternities and sororities students can join, many of which have houses within walking distance of campus. Just like most universities EMU has a National Pan-Hellenic Council, College Panhellenic Council and Interfraternity Council Interfraternity Council comprises eight fraternities, and the Panhellenic Council is made up of nine sororities. National Pan-Hellenic Council consists of 9 historically African-American fraternities and sororities, five fraternities and four sororities.

Alpha Sigma Tau, a national Panhellenic sorority was founded at EMU on November 4, 1899. Sigma Nu Phi, a local sorority, was founded on Eastern's campus September 30, 1897. It is the oldest Greek organization on campus as well as the oldest continually-functioning local sorority in the nation. Greek Life at EMU hosts a yearly event called Greek Week. Greek Week is a week of events centered on Greek unity and spirit. The week often occurs in the beginning of April. Other traditions include Greek Awards. The yearly awards are based on the university's Greek Standards and Assessment Program (GSAP).

Campus media and publications

The Eastern Echo, EMU's independent student newspaper, is published three times a week during the fall and winter semesters and once a week during the spring semester, as well as publishing content online. The paper won eight awards in the 2005 Division 1 Michigan Collegiate Press Association contest, including second place in the general excellence category. The newspaper, which is funded through advertising revenue and university funds, is not under the editorial control of the university.

Also part of the EMU Student Media Office is Cellar Roots, the school's student-run literary and fine arts magazine. Cellar Roots celebrated its 35th anniversary in 2006 with a week of events that highlighted the history of the publication. Cellar Roots is a five-time winner of the National Pacemaker award for design, an award often equated with the Pulitzer Prize for the college level, as well numerous other awards.

EMU hosts two radio stations WQBR and WEMU 89.1 FM. WEMU is a National Public Radio member station. The radio station, which features jazz music, has many student employees and broadcasts many EMU athletic games. WQBR stands for Quirk Building Radio, where the station was once hosted in Quirk. Today WQBR is named Eagle Radio and is no longer hosted in Quirk. Eagle Radio broadcasts from Halle library and is an Internet only radio station at www.eagleradio.org.

The LINGUIST List is a major online resource for the academic field of linguistics. It was founded by Anthony Aristar in early 1990 at the University of Western Australia, and is used as a reference by the National Science Foundation in the United States. Its main and oldest feature is the premoderated electronic mailing list, now with thousands of subscribers all over the world, where queries and their summarized results, discussions, journal table of contents, dissertation abstracts, calls for papers, book and conference announcements, software notices and other useful pieces of linguistic information are posted.

Traditions

Eastern Michigan has several campus-wide traditions throughout the school year. Longstanding traditions include Homecoming, Martin Luther King Jr. Week and the use of the Pray-Harrold Kiosk by students.

The Pray-Harrold Kiosk (or Pillar) is a large cement pillar outside the Pray-Harrold Building and the Rec/IM. The Pillar is painted by various organizations for campus awareness, advertisements and organization unity. The legend is that it started as a flagpole and layers of paint have accumulated over the years.

During Eastern's fall semester, traditions include EagleFest, Community Plunge, and Homecoming. EagleFest occurs during the school's orientation and welcoming weekend in September. The event brings more than 300 campus offices, and student organizations together in University Park & Bowen Field House to showcase campus organizations and services. Community Plunge also occurs during orientation and offers the opportunity for students, staff and faculty to participate in service in the Ypsilanti community.

During Eastern's winter semester campus traditions include: Ethos Week; The Gold Medallion Awards; Relay For Life; and Martin Luther King Jr. Week, held in conjunction with the Martin Luther King Jr. Day holiday, with speakers, community building events and awards in celebration of King and his dream. Ethos Week is a week-long annual event occurring in March and is led by the COB. The event promotes business ethics and ethics education. The Gold Medallions Awards are split into two ceremonies. The Gold Medallion Awards started in 1982 and is organized by Eastern's Student Affairs Division to recognize faculty, students and staff. In 1996, the Student Gold Medallion Awards were established. The award ceremony recognizes student leaders, student organizations, divisional programs, activities or service. Eastern's Relay For Life event is a 24-hour, yearly event held in University Park that started in 1985. The event is centered on supporting the American Cancer Society. The event brings in campus organizations from the entire campus. The event has been held at various times during the year but in recent times the event is held in early April before the school-year ends.

Residence halls & apartments

Eastern Michigan University has 14 residence halls. As of Fall 2014 first-year only residence halls will include Putnam and Phelps. Upperclassmen student living options include: the Village, Buell, and the three apartment complexes. Sellers, Wise, Walton, Downing, Wise, Hill, Hoyt, Pittman and Best house all students, regardless of class ranking. Honors students are housed in Downing and Best Halls. Past locations included Jones and Goddard Halls. Eastern also offers faculty, staff and family housing options in Cornell Courts, and Westview apartments.

According to the university, approximately 5,000 students live on campus. In the fall of 2010, EMU began housing some full-time students in the Village Complex from Washtenaw Community College, which is less than half a mile away, however the program ended in 2011 when housing enrollment went up.

In 2011, Eastern Michigan became the first university in Michigan and the eighth nationwide to offer a targeted program to house single parents with their children on campus. Called "Keys to Degrees", the program will house single-parent families near each other in one of Eastern Michigan's on-campus apartment complexes, and will offer extra academic and personal support to enrollees.

Dining services at EMU are operated by Chartwells Higher Education. Facilities include one buffet-style dining hall, two à la carte dining halls, the Student Center food court, and convenience stores across campus.

In June of 2022, Eastern Michigan finalized plans to invest $200 million into a long-term renovation and addition to the campus' residence halls, including the renovation of all existing residence halls and the construction of two new residence halls.

Safety

EMU former-President Susan W. Martin, Ph.D., took office as EMU's twenty-second president on July 7, 2008, just after the university was fined a then-record $350,000 for not reporting to students the sexual assault and murder of a student in her residence hall room.

Athletics

Eastern Michigan athletic teams have been successful on a national level, winning three NCAA Division II national championships and 13 NAIA Division I national championships in five different sports (baseball, men's cross country, men's swimming and diving, men's indoor track and field, and men's outdoor track and field).

EMU has also been NCAA Division I national runner-up twice in 1940 and 1976. In 1940, the men's cross country team finished second to the Indiana Hoosiers. In 1976, the baseball team was defeated by the Arizona Wildcats in the final game of the College World Series. The Eagles have the most MAC championships in a single sport, 29, in men's swimming and diving. For men's and women's Track and field (indoor and outdoor), collectively holds the record for most MAC titles out of all the EMU athletics teams.

Eastern's men's basketball team has appeared in four NCAA Division I tournaments, and have a 3–4 record, tied for third best among Michigan colleges. In the 1996 men's basketball tournament, Eastern Michigan defeated the Duke Blue Devils in the opening round.

The 2006–2007 season was a successful one for Eastern Michigan, as they won an EMU and Mid-American Conference record eight conference titles: Men's Cross Country, Men's Swimming And Diving, Women's Swimming And Diving, Softball, Men's Indoor Track, Women's Gymnastics, Men's Golf and Men's Outdoor Track. This beat the school's previous record of five titles as well as the previous MAC record of six.

In 1987, EMU won its first Mid-American Conference title then defeated 17-point favorite San Jose State in the California Bowl.

There have been small successes though, such as a 6–4 record against rivals the Western Michigan Broncos and the Central Michigan Chippewas in the 5 years under coach Jeff Genyk from 2004 to 2008, setting a school record for a 5-year span against Western and Central.

Since the 1991 season, Eastern Michigan athletic teams have gone by the nickname "Eagles". Prior to the 1991 season EMU used the name "Hurons". EMU used the Hurons name and Indian logo from 1929 until 1991. Despite much controversy, support of the Huron tribes in Oklahoma and Quebec, and anger among its alumni, EMU changed the logo after the Michigan Department of Civil Rights issued a report suggesting all schools drop such logos. During the Michigan State Normal College years the school went by the nicknames such as "Normalites" and "Men from Ypsi" and various other titles.

People

EMU has more than 145,000 living alumni. Notable politicians and public servants from Eastern Michigan include 7nd Governor of North Dakota Frederick Fancher, 31st Governor of Michigan Fred W. Green, Michigan Supreme Court Chief Justice Marilyn Jean Kelly, Wisconsin Supreme Court Chief Justice Marvin B. Rosenberry, U.S. Senators Royal Copeland, Charles E. Potter, U.S. Representatives William W. Chalmers, William Horace Frankhauser, Patrick H. Kelley, Carl D. Pursell, Henry F. Thomas, Frank W. Wheeler, and Alfred Lucking, and former U.S. Secretary of Transportation Rodney E. Slater.

Billionaire Bruce T. Halle, founder of Roush Fenway Keselowski Racing Jack Roush are all also EMU alums. Other notable EMU alumni include Dann Florek, Winsor McCay, Nagarjuna, Greg Mathis, Dave Coverly, Ryan Drummond.

EMU alumni in the NBA include Earl Boykins, Kennedy McIntosh, and "the Iceman" George Gervin. NFL player Charlie Batch also attended Eastern Michigan.

Notes

References

External links

 
 
 Eastern Michigan Athletics website

 
Public universities and colleges in Michigan
Ypsilanti, Michigan
Universities and colleges in Washtenaw County, Michigan
Educational institutions established in 1849
1849 establishments in Michigan
Buildings with sculpture by Corrado Parducci
Universities and colleges accredited by the Higher Learning Commission